The 1945 Tour of Flanders was held in 1945.

General classification

Final general classification

References
Résultats sur siteducyclisme.net
Résultats sur cyclebase.nl
Résultats sur les-sports.info

External links
 

Tour of Flanders
1945 in road cycling
1945 in Belgian sport